The Dasycladaceae is one of the two extant families of green algae of the order Dasycladales. When found in Palaeozoic limestones, they typically indicate depositional depth of less than 5m.

Genera

 †Acicularia
 †Acroporella
 Amicus
 Anatolipora
 Andrusoporella
 Anfractuosoporella
 †Anisoporella
 †Anthracoporella
 †Archaeocladus
 †Atractyliopsis
 Batophora
 †Beresella
 Bornetella
 †Chinianella
 Chloroclados
 †Clavapora
 †Clavaporella
 Connexia
 Cylindroporella
 Cymopolia
 Dasycladus
 Dissocladella
 †Dvinella
 †Endoina
 †Eoclypeina
 Eogoniolina
 †Eovelebitella
 †Epimastopora
 †Euteutloporella
 †Favoporella
 †Fourcadella
 †Genotella
 †Goniolinopsis
 †Gyroporella
 Halicoryne
 Holosporella
 †Imperiella
 †Kantia
 †Kochanskyella
 †Lacrymorphus
 †Macroporella
 †Mizzia
 †Nanjinoporella
 Neomeris
 †Oligoporella
 †Ollaria
 †Pentaporella
 †Permopora
 †Placklesia
 †Salpingoporella
 †Teutloporella
 †Thailandoporella
 †Uragiella
 †Uragiellopsis
 †Uraloporella
 †Velomorpha
 †Vermiporella
 †Xainzanella
 †Zaporella

References

External links

 
Green algae families
Taxa named by Friedrich Traugott Kützing